Pak Red Crescent Medical and Dental College (PRCMDC), ( established in 2011, is a private college of medicine and dentistry located on Multan Road, Kasur, Punjab, Pakistan. It is registered with PMC, listed in WHO Avicenna Directories and IMED, affiliated with UHS, and approved by Ministry of Health. Social Security Hospital and Pak Red Crescent Hospital are attached as training and teaching hospitals.
It was established by the Pakistan Red Crescent Society, which is working since time immemorial towards the improvement of health, prevention of disease and mitigation of human suffering by manmade and natural disaster.
The principal aim of establishing the Pak Red Crescent Medical College along with a teaching hospital is to provide healthcare facilities to the underprivileged population of District Kasur and southern part of Lahore. The College has highly qualified and experienced faculty along with all the latest teaching facilities including digital library and computer labs.

References

External links
  
 IMED WDOMS profile

Medical colleges in Punjab, Pakistan
Dental schools in Pakistan